Raketa ("Rocket") wristwatches, have been manufactured since 1961 by the Petrodvorets Watch Factory in Saint Petersburg. The Petrodvorets Watch Factory is Russia's oldest factory, founded by Peter the Great in 1721. Raketa watches have been produced for the Red Army, the Soviet Navy, and for North Pole expeditions, as well as for civilians. Today, Raketa is one of a handful of global watch brands that produces its own movements from start to finish.

History 
On 13 April 1961, Yuri Gagarin made the first manned flight in outer space on the rocket Vostok 1. In honor of this achievement, the Petrodvorets Watch Factory named its watches "Rocket"; Raketa in Russian. However, at the height of the Cold War the name "Raketa" was perceived negatively in the West, as the word was associated with the latest generation of Soviet intercontinental ballistic missiles, the R-16. During Soviet times it became one of the most produced watch brands in the world. At the peak of production in the 1970s, the factory produced about five million hand-wound watches per year.

With prices similar to Swiss luxury brands, the quality, fit and finish of Raketa timepieces have improved markedly since the 1960s. Since "Raketa" is one of the rare manufacturers capable of fully producing its watches, including movements, hairsprings and escapements in-house, its parent firm, Petrodvorets Watch Factory, is beginning to supply some Swiss watch brands having difficulty acquiring Swiss ETA movements.

Raketa Mechanical Movements
Over the years, the Petrodvorets Watch Factory has produced more than two dozen versions of Raketa movements.

The Petrodvorets Watchmaking School
Being one of the few watch brands in the world producing its own movements, the factory has created its own watchmaking school, the Petrodvorets Watchmaking School, to ensure the transmission of watchmaking expertise to future generations. The only one left in the schooling program has been established in collaboration with the Saint Petersburg Technical institute.

Hairsprings and Escapements
The Petrodvorets Watch Factory Raketa is one of only five watch brands in the world producing their movements in-house from start to finish, including hairsprings and escapements. Most watch brands globally do not produce their own hairsprings, they generally order them from Nivarox, a subsidiary of Swatch Group. This enables the Russian watch industry to be independent from western suppliers, especially for producing hairsprings needed in the military aviation industry.

Raketa Monumental Clock
Built in 2014 on Moscow's Lubyanka Square in the main atrium of the Central Children's Store on Lubyanka, the Raketa Monumental Clock is the world's largest clock movement. It weighs 5 tons and measures 13 metres high by 8 metres wide. Built and assembled in a record six months, it has rapidly become a major tourist attraction in Moscow. The Mayor of Moscow, Sergey Sobyanin inaugurated the clock in January 2015.

The Petrodvorets Watch Factory
Raketa is only one of the brands produced by the Petrodvorets Watch Factory.

Ambassadors and Swiss specialists
In 2009, the Petrodvorets Watch Factory employed three highly ranked Swiss watchmakers to help the factory adapt its production to modern standards. These watchmakers had previously worked for Rolex, Breguet and Hautlence.
In 2011, the Petrodvorets Watch Factory announced that supermodel Natalia Vodianova offered to design a new watch model. Vodianova's model is based on a vintage Raketa design from 1974. A portion of the sales of this "Raketa by Vodianova" will be contributed to Vodianova's Naked Heart Foundation. In 2012, Jean-Claude Quenet, former director of Rolex's escapement department and of production at Franck Muller, joined the Russian factory. Also, in 2013 Prince Rostislav Rostislavovich Romanov became advisor to the creative department of the factory and a member of its board of directors. He created a special new design of watches commemorating the 400-year jubilee of the Romanov Dynasty.

Awards 
Soviet Order of the Red Banner of Labour (1971).

Further reading
Fersman, A.E. and N.I. Vlodavec: State Peterhof Lapidary Works in past, present, future. Published: USSR 1922
Sukhorukova, A.E.: Watchmaker: The Story of one Factory. Published: USSR 1983. - 108 p.
Tyutenkova, A.G.: Checking Time. Published: Lenizdat, 1986. - 181 p.

References

External links
 
 Russian State TV documentary 2003 about the 300 years of History of the factory
 Snob Mag. About Vodianova working for Raketa

Russian brands
High fashion brands
Watch manufacturing companies of Russia
Soviet watch brands
Watch manufacturing companies of the Soviet Union